Selo pri Radohovi Vasi is a small settlement north of Radohova Vas in the Municipality of Ivančna Gorica in central Slovenia. The entire area is part of the historical region of Lower Carniola and the municipality is now included in the Central Slovenia Statistical Region.

Name
The name of the settlement was changed from Selo pri Svetem Pavlu (literally, 'Selo near Saint Paul') to Sela pri Radohovi Vasi (literally, 'Sela near Radohova Vas') in 1955. The name was changed on the basis of the 1948 Law on Names of Settlements and Designations of Squares, Streets, and Buildings as part of efforts by Slovenia's postwar communist government to remove religious elements from toponyms.

References

External links
Selo pri Radohovi Vasi on Geopedia

Populated places in the Municipality of Ivančna Gorica